Robert Vano (born Róbert Vaňo; May 5, 1948) is a Slovak photographer living in Prague.

Life and work
Vano was born in Nové Zámky, Czechoslovakia, to parents of Hungarian descent. After his exams in 1967, instead of joining the armed forces for duty, he emigrated via Yugoslavia and Italy to the United States where he made a living as a hairdresser and makeup artist. Later on, he worked as an assistant for photographers (Horst P. Horst, Marco Glaviano or Leo Castelli).

Since 1984 he has worked as an independent photographer. He worked in New York City, Paris, Milan and Prague, where he photographed for fashion magazines such as Cosmopolitan, Harper's Bazaar and Vogue.

Since 1995 he lives in Prague, where in 1996 to 2003 he worked as artistic director of the Czech edition of the Elle magazine, and then in 2009 to 2014 as creative director at Czechoslovak Models. Since then he has worked as a freelance photographer.

Vano is primarily a fashion and commercial photographer. He makes black and white portraits and male nudes on film and also a now little-used technique of platinotype. He prefers photographing in daylight.

In 2010 he was awarded the European Trebbia award for creative activities.

Vano's largest exhibition called The Platinum Collection, referencing his signature technique, took place in Prague's Mánes venue in 2009.

Publications
 Love You from Prague. Praha : Radost, 1991. . 
 Boys and roses. Praha : Scarabeus, 1992. .
 Někdy ráj. Praha : XYZ, 2008. With David Hrbek. .
 Platinová kolekce. České Budějovice : Karmášek, 2009. .
 Kuchařka pro kluky. Brno: Computer Press, 2010. .
 Robert Vano. Praha: Artfoto 2010. .
 Fotka nemusí být ostrá. Praha : Slovart, 2015. .
 Memories. Praha: Slovart, 2016.

References

External links

1948 births
Photographers from Prague
Gay artists
Slovak LGBT people
LGBT photographers
Czech LGBT artists
Living people
Slovak expatriates in the United States
Slovak photographers